Gunnison may refer to:
 Foster Gunnison Jr. (1925–1994), American LGBT rights activist and independent archivist
John W. Gunnison (1812–1853), American explorer whose name is used in several places in the Western states
 The Gunnison River in Colorado
 Black Canyon of the Gunnison National Park
 Gunnison, Colorado
 Gunnison County, Colorado
 Gunnison, Mississippi
 Gunnison, Utah
 Gunnison Island, Great Salt Lake, Utah

Other places 
 Gunnison Beach, Sandy Hook, New Jersey

Other uses
Gunnison's prairie dog (Cynomys gunnisoni Baird 1855)